Arlen Quincy Harris (born April 22, 1980) is a former NFL running back played for the St. Louis Rams, Detroit Lions, and the Atlanta Falcons.  He played college football for the University of Virginia and Hofstra University.  He won a PIAA State Championship at Downingtown High School.

Biography
Arlen was born in Chester, Pennsylvania,  and was considered one of the top 3 running backs coming out of Downingtown High School where he won a PIAA State Championship. He also played in the Big 33 All-Star game vs the top players in Ohio and walked away with MVP.
In college, Harris did not play either his junior year, due to an injury to his knee, or his senior year because he transferred and lost that year's eligibility. So, Harris did not play football for two years until he made his return to football in an all-star game in Las Vegas and was named MVP.

Harris was undrafted, but he was signed by the NFL's St. Louis Rams. He played three seasons with the Rams, starting three games. He moved to the Detroit Lions in 2006, also starting three games there. He ended his career with the Atlanta Falcons with a knee injury in the last pre-season game vs the Baltimore Ravens.

Harris now runs his own business, Run It Performance, that develops top youth running backs. He is also heavily involved in the community with his foundation, church, and youth programs. Harris has been married to his wife Heather for 16 years, and together they have three children Caeli, Arlen Jr., and Ayden.

In 2017, Harris was inducted into the Chester County Sports Hall of Fame.

References

1980 births
American football running backs
Detroit Lions players
Hofstra Pride football players
Living people
People from Downingtown, Pennsylvania
Players of American football from Pennsylvania
Sportspeople from Chester, Pennsylvania
Sportspeople from Chester County, Pennsylvania
St. Louis Rams players
Virginia Cavaliers football players